Tskneti is an urban-type settlement (Daba) in southwestern part of Vake District, Tbilisi, Georgia, on the right bank of the river Mtkvari.

Geography
Tskhneti is located on the eastern slopes of the Trialeti Range, in the gorge of the Vere River (right tributary of the Mtkvari), 8 km from the center of Tbilisi and 950 m above sea level.

Climate
The daba of Tskhneti has a warm humid continental climate, with mild winters and long warm summers. The average temperature is 13 ° C. The warmest month is August, at 24 ° C, and the coldest January, at −2 ° C. The average rainfall is 738 millimeters per year. The wettest month is May, with 122 millimeters of rain, and the wettest December, with 31 millimeters.

History
Late Bronze Age pottery and tombs have been found in the vicinity of Tskneti. It has been known as a summer place since ancient times. Intensive summer development in lower Tskneti started in the second half of the 19th-century, in upper Tskneti - in the 20th-century. Three small churches of 17th-19th centuries are preserved. It received the status of a Daba in 1967. In 2008, it was incorporated into the city of Tbilisi.

Bibliography
Georgian Soviet Encyclopedia, V. 11, p. 372, Tbilisi, 1987

References

Populated places in Tbilisi
Vake District